Peach Orchard may refer to:
The Peach Orchard, a Gettysburg Battlefield site.
Peach Orchard, Arkansas
Peach Orchard, Kentucky
Peach Orchard, Missouri
Peach Orchard Township, Ford County, Illinois
An orchard where peaches are cultivated
 The Peach Orchard (album)